Naik Kaushal Yadav was squad commander in 9 Para. He fought in 1999 Kargil War between India and Pakistan. He was awarded India's third highest gallantry award Vir Chakra posthumously.

References

People from Chhattisgarh
Recipients of the Vir Chakra